Gumut is a village and gram panchayat in the Bishnupur CD block in the Bishnupur subdivision of the Bankura district in the state of West Bengal, India. It includes Muninagar.

Geography

Location

Note: The map alongside presents some of the notable locations in the subdivision. All places marked in the map are linked in the larger full screen map.

Demographics
According to the 2011 Census of India, Gumut had a total population of 1,723, of which 872 (51%) were males and 851 (49%) were females. There were 162 persons in the age range of 0–6 years. The total number of literate persons in Gumut was 1,136 (72.77% of the population over 6 years).

Education
Gumut Vidyasagar Sisu Shiksha Niketan was established in 2010 and Gumut Girls Primary School was established in 1939.

Muninagar Radhakanta Bidyapith is a Bengali-medium coeducational institution established in 1956. It has facilities for teaching from class V to class XII. The school has 10 computers, a library with 2,500 books and a playground.

Culture
David J. McCutchion mentions the Muninagar Radha Kanta temple, located in Gumut, as a smooth twin deuls  plain laterite temple built in 1678.

At places such as Kharar and the 17th century Radha Kanta temple at Muninagar and earlier at Baidyapur, the porch is almost as high as the main shrine, giving the impression of twin deuls.

The temple of Radha Kanta at Muninagar (at Sr No S-WB-10) is included in the List of State Protected Monuments in West Bengal by the Archaeological Survey of India.

References

Villages in Bankura district